Dianne Prost O'Leary (born 1951) is an American mathematician and computer scientist whose research concerns scientific computing, computational linear algebra, and the history of scientific computing. She is Distinguished University Professor Emerita of Computer Science at the University of Maryland, College Park, and is the author of the book Scientific Computing with Case Studies (SIAM, 2009).

Early life and education
O'Leary was born November 20, 1951, in Chicago.
She majored in mathematics at Purdue University, graduating in 1972,
and completed her Ph.D. in computer science at Stanford University in 1976. Her dissertation, Hybrid Conjugate Gradient Algorithms, was supervised by Gene H. Golub.

Career
After taking an assistant professorship in mathematics at the University of Michigan, she moved to Maryland in 1978, with a joint appointment in computer science and the Institute for Physical Science and Technology. She also became affiliated with Maryland's applied mathematics program in 1979, and became a member of Maryland's Institute for Advanced Computer Studies in 1985. She became Distinguished University Professor in 2014, the same year that she retired.

From 2009 to 2015 she was editor in chief of the SIAM Journal on Matrix Analysis and Applications.

Recognition
The University of Waterloo gave O'Leary an honorary doctorate in 2005. She was named a Fellow of the Association for Computing Machinery in 2006, "for mentoring activities and contributions to numerical algorithms", and became one of the inaugural Fellows of the Society for Industrial and Applied Mathematics (SIAM) in 2009. In 2008 she was the Sonia Kovalevsky Lecturer of SIAM and the Association for Women in Mathematics.

References

External links
Home page
Google scholar profile

1951 births
Living people
American computer scientists
20th-century American mathematicians
21st-century American mathematicians
American women computer scientists
American women mathematicians
Purdue University alumni
Stanford University alumni
University of Michigan faculty
University of Maryland, College Park faculty
Fellows of the Society for Industrial and Applied Mathematics
Fellows of the Association for Computing Machinery
20th-century women mathematicians
21st-century women mathematicians
20th-century American women
21st-century American women